Walter James West (October 26, 1917 – September 13, 1984) was an American football player and coach.

Playing career
West played quarterback at the University of Pittsburgh  for the Panthers during the 1941 and 1942 seasons, graduating from the university with a bachelor of science from the School of Education in 1943. Thereafter entering the Army, West played fullback for the intercollegiate football team fielded by the Army Air Forces' Randolph Field base in 1943. That season the Randolph Field Ramblers achieved a 9–1 record and appeared in the 1944 Cotton Bowl Classic.

Cleveland Rams
West played professionally in the National Football League (NFL) for the Cleveland Rams in 1944 and was the leading rusher for the team that year.  He played in nine games that year and carried the ball 66 times for a total of 220 yards and scored one touchdown.  He also pulled in 9 receptions for an additional 64 yards and played some on defense, recording two interceptions.

Coaching career

High school
Prior to coaching in college, West coached high school football and basketball at Leechburg High School.

Geneva College
West was named the 21st head football coach at the Geneva College in Beaver Falls, Pennsylvania.  He held that position for four years, from 1949 until 1952. His coaching record at Geneva was 18–14–2.  Geneva College fans generally consider him among the best coaches the school has had.

References

External links
 

1917 births
1984 deaths
American football fullbacks
American football quarterbacks
Cleveland Rams players
Geneva Golden Tornadoes football coaches
Pittsburgh Panthers football players
Randolph Field Ramblers football players
High school basketball coaches in Pennsylvania
High school football coaches in Pennsylvania
People from Washington County, Pennsylvania
Coaches of American football from Pennsylvania
Players of American football from Pennsylvania